Guerolito is the second remix album by Beck, released in 2005. It features all of the songs from regular edition of Guero in remixed forms by a variety of artists, with the addition of "Clap Hands", originally found on the special limited edition of Guero.

Guerolito reached number 191 on the Billboard 200. As of 2008, Guerolito has sold 76,000 copies in the United States.

Background
In a 2006 interview, Beck challenged other artists to follow his lead—set by Guerolito—in abandoning the traditional concept of an album release:

Track listing
All songs were written by Beck Hansen and The Dust Brothers, except where noted.

"Ghost Range" ("E-Pro" remix by Homelife) (Hansen, Dust Brothers, Beastie Boys) – 4:24
"Qué Onda Guero" (Islands remix) – 2:29
"Girl" (Octet remix) – 3:53
 Originally released on the special edition CD/DVD package of Guero
"Heaven Hammer" ("Missing" remix by Air) (Hansen, Dust Brothers, Vinicius de Moraes, Carlos Lyra) – 4:54
"Shake Shake Tambourine" ("Black Tambourine" remix by Ad-Rock) (Hansen, Dust Brothers, Eugene Blacknell) – 3:37
"Terremoto Tempo" ("Earthquake Weather" remix by Mario C) (Hansen, Dust Brothers, Mark Adams, Steve Washington, Daniel Webster, Mark Hicks) – 3:47
"Ghettochip Malfunction" ("Hell Yes" remix by 8-Bit) – 2:39
 Originally released on the Hell Yes EP
"Broken Drum" (Boards of Canada remix) (Hansen) – 5:36
 Originally released on the special edition CD/DVD package of Guero
"Scarecrow" (El-P remix) – 4:37
"Wish Coin" ("Go It Alone" remix by Diplo) (Hansen, Dust Brothers, Jack White) – 3:44
"Farewell Ride" (Subtle remix) (Hansen) – 4:51
"Rental Car" (John King remix) – 2:59
"Emergency Exit" (Th' Corn Gangg remix) – 3:18
"Clap Hands" – 3:19
 Originally released on the special edition CD/DVD package of Guero

Bonus tracks on UK release
"Fax Machine Anthem (Hell Yes)" (Dizzee Rascal remix) – 3:07
 Originally released on the special edition CD/DVD package of Guero
"Qué Onda Guero" (Nortec Collective remix) – 4:44

References

External links

Beck albums
2005 remix albums
Interscope Records remix albums
Albums produced by Beck
Albums produced by the Dust Brothers
Albums with cover art by Marcel Dzama